Caecilia Metella may refer to:

 Caecilia Metella (daughter of Balearicus)
 Caecilia Metella (daughter of Celer)
 Caecilia Metella (daughter of Delmaticus), fourth wife of dictator Sulla
 Tomb of Caecilia Metella, on the Appian Way in Rome

See also
 Caecilii Metelli